AICA may refer to either:

Australian Indigenous Communications Association
 Food Information and Control Agency, a Spanish government agency, AICA by its name in Spanish.
International Association of Art Critics
Anterior inferior cerebellar artery, a major blood supply to the cerebellum
 American Committee for the Independence of Armenia, now known as Armenian National Committee of America
 American Innovation and Competitiveness Act, U.S. legislation supporting scientific initiatives passed in 2017
 Yamaha AICA, the sound processor used in the Sega Dreamcast console